Escuela Sierra Nevada is a private school in the Mexico City metropolitan area. It was established in 1950 and serves preschool through high school.

Campuses
Preschool through high school:
 Interlomas - Huixquilucan, State of Mexico
 San Mateo - Naucalpan, State of Mexico

Preschool through elementary school:
 Esmeralda - Atizapán, State of Mexico (its secondary school will open in August 2022 starting with 7th Grade).
 Lomas - Two locations in Lomas de Chapultepec, Miguel Hidalgo

Center for low income students in preschool through elementary school (opened 2003):
 Centro Educativo Nemi - Colonia del Valle, Benito Juárez

References

3. Koa empieza la secundaria en Esmeralda. Retrieved on December 7, 2021.

External links
 Escuela Sierra Nevada
  Escuela Sierra Nevada

Private schools in Mexico
Schools in Mexico City
High schools in the State of Mexico
Benito Juárez, Mexico City
1950 establishments in Mexico
Educational institutions established in 1950